Scar Crags is a fell in the north western part of the English Lake District in the county of Cumbria. It is one of the Coledale group of fells situated seven kilometres south west of Keswick and reaches a height of 672 metres (2205 feet).

Topography
The fell is part of the long ridge that radiates easterly from Eel Crag and includes the adjoining fells of Sail and Causey Pike before dropping to the Newlands Valley. Scar Crags is characterised by steep craggy flanks on its southern side which fall away steeply to Rigg Beck, while the northern slopes are less steep and grassy as they drop to Stoneycroft Gill.

Geology
The ridgeline is composed of the laminated mudstone and siltstone of the Kirkstile Formation.

Ascents
Scar Crags is very rarely climbed directly. The only feasible direct ascent follows an old mine road that starts from Stair and goes up Stoneycroft Gill to finish at Sail Pass, from where it is a short ascent to the fell summit.  Scar Crags is more usually approached from the east along the ridge from Causey Pike or from the west from Sail. It is a busy fell as it is  part of the Coledale Round, a 17.5 kilometre walk starting and finishing at Braithwaite or Stair in the Newlands valley and including the other nearby fells of Grisedale Pike, Hopegill Head, Eel Crag, Sail, and Causey Pike with over 1300 metres of ascent.

Summit
The top of the fell is grassy and often muddy with a small cairn and gives a heady view down onto Rigg Beck and a good but not exceptional all round view of the district.

Mining
The northern slopes of Scar Crags, below Long Crag, contain the remains of the Lake District’s only cobalt mine. It was opened by the Keswick Mining Company in 1846, who invested £7,000 in the project. A road and an inclined tramway were built to convey the ore down to Stoneycroft in the Newlands valley. Four adits were driven into the hillside, the longest being about 60 metres in length. The mine was not a success as it was impossible to extract the mineral from the ore in the expected quantities and it closed in due course.

References
 A Pictorial Guide to the Lakeland Fells, The North Western Fells: Alfred Wainwright:  
 Mines and Mining in the English Lake District: John Postlethwaite: 

Hewitts of England
Fells of the Lake District
Nuttalls